The Grand View Lookout Tower is a fire lookout in Kaibab National Forest near the South Rim of the Grand Canyon. Its observation cabin measures  square. A small cabin is included in the designated area.

The Arizona Trail passes the tower. The Hull Cabin Historic District is nearby.

The Grandview Lookout Tower was placed on the National Register of Historic Places on January 28, 1988.

References

External links

 Grandview Lookout Tower at Kaibab National Forest
 

Fire lookout towers on the National Register of Historic Places in Arizona
Government buildings completed in 1936
Buildings and structures in Coconino County, Arizona
Kaibab National Forest
1936 establishments in Arizona
National Register of Historic Places in Coconino County, Arizona